Winnie Kiiru is a Kenyan biologist, elephant conservationist, and the chairperson of the Wildlife Research Institute in Naivasha. She is currently the chairperson of Friends of Karura Forest, a Community-Based Organization (CBO) that helps manage Karura forests.

She is also the founder and Executive Director of CHD Conservation Kenya, a CBO based in Amboseli that believes in people-centered conservation.

Education 
In 1995, Kiiru earned a Master's degree from the University of Zimbabwe in Tropical Resource Ecology. Kiiru earned a PhD in biology from the University of Kent in Canterbury.

Career 
Kiiru has worked for the Elephant Protection Initiative and the Stop Ivory initiative. Dr. Kiiru is the chairperson of the Wildlife Research Institute in Naivasha and the acting chairperson of the Wildlife Research Training Institute in Kenya. Kiiru is a trustee of the Kenya Wildlife Service and the Amboseli Trust for Elephants.

Kiiru helped persuade the Kenyan government to publicly burn ivory tusks, and a video of the burning featured in the 2018 film Anthropocene: The Human Epoch.

References

External links 

 Kiiru's 2016 op-ed Stop the Ivory Trade

Living people
Kenyan biologists
Kenyan conservationists
Elephant conservation
21st-century Kenyan women writers
University of Zimbabwe alumni
Year of birth missing (living people)